The Città di Como Challenger is a tennis tournament held in Como, Italy since 2006. The event is part of the ATP Challenger Tour and is played on outdoor clay courts.

Past finals

Singles

Doubles

External links 
Official website
Como - Overview 
ITF Search

 
ATP Challenger Tour
2006 establishments in Italy